Spider-Man (Peter Parker) from the Marvel Mangaverse is an alternate version of Spider-Man created by Kaare Andrews. He is just one of many examples of different cultural Spider-Men much like Spider-Man (Pavitr Prabhakar), Spider-Man 2099, and Miles Morales.

The character will make his cinematic debut in the 2023 feature film Spider-Man: Across the Spider-Verse, depicted as a member of Miguel O'Hara's Spider-Forces.

Publication history 
The Marvel Mangaverse is a comic book universe which was set in the Marvel Comics Multiverse created by Ben Dunn. The universe's  incarnation of Peter Parker would debut in Marvel Mangaverse: Spider-Man (2002) the first of a five part mini-series,  which was created, written and drawn by Kaare Andrews. Andrews depicted this version of Spider-Man as a ninja and the last of the Spider Clan after his Uncle Ben was killed by Venom. The character is the third depicted manga version of Spider-Man after Spider-Man: The Manga and Spider-Man J.

Fictional character biography 
The Mangaverse Spider-Man first appeared in the first series (created, written and drawn by Kaare Andrews) where his origin was very different from the regular Marvel Spider-Man.  In the Mangaverse Peter Parker is the last member of the Spider Clan of ninjas and has been taught martial arts by his sensei, Uncle Ben. After Ben's murder by Venom, an underling of the Kingpin, Peter starts to train in secret so he will be strong enough to exact his revenge. In this version of Spider-Man, Aunt May is Peter's mother's sister instead of Uncle Ben being his father's brother. The Mangaverse Spider-Man was brought back for his own mini-series (again written by original creator Kaare Andrews) in which he encounters a cybernetic version of the Black Cat, as well as the Venom symbiote. This symbiote does not become Venom and has mystical origins and connections to an 'evil' clan of Ninja who are affiliated with Spiders, apparently a counterpart to Spider-Man's own ninja clan. Norman Osborn, better known as the Green Goblin, has a minor appearance in the series.

In New Mangaverse: The Rings of Fate, references are made to both the death of Captain America and in the Spider-Man: Legend of the Spider Clan miniseries which introduced his black costume and the Mangaverse Black Cat. During the course of this series, Spider-Man develops the unexpected ability to shoot webbing, which surprises him entirely. He is also the object of affection for both the Black Cat (though she later turns out to have been in league with the Mangaverse Nick Fury, her true loyalty unknown), and Mary Jane Watson, who becomes the Mangaverse version of Spider-Woman, and is shown to be being trained by Peter in the ways of the Spider-Clan.

Unlike in the mainline Marvel Universe where Peter Parker, Mary Jane Watson, and Felicia Hardy are now adults, all three of them are in their early to mid-teens at this point, and possibly their mid-to-late teens by the time of New Mangaverse. This version of Spidey has wrapped gloves, a backpack emblazoned with the spider symbol, and tennis shoes.

Spider-Verse 
The Mangaverse incarnation later appears in the crossover comic book storyline entitled Spider-Verse. He was one of the starred characters in the anthology comic book Spider-Verse #1 starring in the story "Spider Clan: The Many" continuing the Marvel Mangaverse series that starred him before. The story is written by Skottie Young and Jake Andrews.  Jesse Schedeen of IGN explained that despite that "fans of the Mangaverse Spider-Man will be pleased to see that Peter Parker return", he expressed  Kaare Andrews not returning as unfortunate and also expressing disappointment with the new writers. He felt that Young "goes through a lot of effort in sending Peter on a journey to confront his heritage, only for it not to matter much in the end." He also compared it as Avatar: The Last Airbender-lite than being truly manga-inspired. Meanwhile, comic book writer Nick Lowe complimented their work calling it "great".

Other versions 
An alternate version of Peter Parker from the Mangaverse appears in the series Spider-Man Family Featuring Spider-Clan. He also appears in The Amazing Spider-Man (vol. 3) #12  teaming up with The Manga's Spider-Man and  SP//dr. Jesse Schedeen praised that scene, describing as one of the highlights of the comics book issue.

In other media

Film
The Mangaverse Spider-Man will appear in the upcoming Spider-Man: Across the Spider-Verse as a member of Miguel O'Hara's Spider-Forces.

Video games
 
 The Mangaverse Spider-Man's suit appears as an alternate suit for the Ultimate Spider-Man in Spider-Man: Shattered Dimensions.
 The Mangaverse Spider-Man appears as an unlockable playable character in Spider-Man Unlimited. He is depicted as the first alternate dimension recruit to help the main version of Spider-Man.
 The Mangaverse Spider-Man's suit appears as an unlockable DLC costume for the titular character of Marvel's Spider-Man as part of the "Turf Wars" DLC.

Reception 
Shane Denson of Transnational Perspectives on Graphic Narratives: Comics at the Crossroads was negative on the mini-series starring the comic book character feeling that it did not offer enough transnational and transcultural themes unlike the other manga series starring Spider-Man. He also compared it to Star Wars with Uncle Ben being much like Yoda, Spider-Man being like Luke Skywalker and Venom being like Darth Vader with him being revealed as Spider-Man's cousin.

References

External links 
 

Alternative versions of Spider-Man
Comics characters introduced in 2002
Fictional characters with superhuman durability or invulnerability
Fictional ninja
Marvel Comics characters with superhuman strength
Vigilante characters in comics